The Virtual Human Markup Language often abbreviated as VHML is a markup language used for the computer animation of human bodies and facial expressions. The language is designed to describe various aspects of human-computer interactions with regards to facial animation, text to Speech, and multimedia information.

Format 
VHML consists of the following so-called "sub-languages":

 Emotional Markup Language (EML)
 Gesture Markup Language (GML)
 Speech Markup Language (SML)
 Facial Animation Markup Language (FAML)
 Body Animation Markup Language (BAML)
 Extensible HyperText Markup Language (XHTML)
 Dialogue Manager Markup Language (DMML)

See also
 Rich Representation Language

Sources

External links

 VHML.org

Markup languages